Eric Cecil Deacon (born 25 May 1950 in Oxford) is an English actor and writer perhaps best known for his role in the 1985 film A Zed & Two Noughts, directed by Peter Greenaway, in which he acted alongside his brother Brian.

He trained as an actor at the Webber Douglas Academy of Dramatic Art and in repertory theatre. His other film roles include The Sex Thief (1973), It Could Happen to You (1975), À nous les petites Anglaises (1976), and Yesterday's Hero (1979).

He has been very active on television with credits including: Z-Cars, Survivors, Secret Army, Minder, Doctor Who (in the serial Timelash), C.A.T.S. Eyes, Dempsey and Makepeace, The Bill, Prime Suspect, Lovejoy, Casualty, Doctors and London's Burning.

References

External links
 

Living people
1950 births
English male film actors
English male television actors
Male actors from Oxfordshire
English television writers
People from Oxford